Araracuara may refer to:
 Araracuara, Colombia, region in Colombia
 Araracuara Airport
 Araracuara language
 Araracuara (plant), a genus of flowering plants in the family Rhamnaceae

See also
 Araraquara